Malcolm Everard MacLaren Pearson, Baron Pearson of Rannoch (born 20 July 1942) is a British businessman and former Leader of the UK Independence Party (UKIP). He sits as an independent member of the House of Lords. A Eurosceptic, he was a staunch supporter of pro-Brexit campaign Leave Means Leave.

Early life and career
Born in Devizes, the son of John M. and Rosabel C. Pearson ( Moysey), Pearson was educated at Eton College. Prior to entering politics, he had a career in international insurance. During the Cold War, he was a leading critic of totalitarianism in the Soviet Union and supported Soviet dissidents. He worked closely with Russian author and dissident Aleksandr Solzhenitsyn to ensure that funds reached other artists and dissidents working inside the Soviet Union, and hosted Solzhenitsyn on his Rannoch estate. In 1984, Pearson established the Rannoch Charitable Trust, which funded many refugees escaping from the Soviet Union. In recognition of his efforts, Pearson was awarded in 2007 the Senator Henry "Scoop" Jackson Award For Values and Vision in Politics.

Pearson was created a life peer on 18 June 1990 as Baron Pearson of Rannoch, of Bridge of Gaur in the District of Perth and Kinross, sitting as a Conservative. He entered the House for services to the insurance industry, particularly his anti-corruption stance on the Savonita affair.

In February 1997, Hugo Gurdon published an interview in The Daily Telegraph with Pearson, discussing his metaphysical and political beliefs and motivations.
 
Pearson became Treasurer of the degree-awarding body to the polytechnic sector, the Council for National Academic Awards, serving from 1983 to 1992.

A daughter from his second marriage, born in 1980, introduced him to the world of learning disabilities for which he has done extensive work and fundraising, in particular for the Camphill movement.

Pearson is a Eurosceptic of long standing. In May 2004, he called for voters to back the UK Independence Party (UKIP). Along with three other Conservative peers, he was then expelled by the Conservative Party on 30 May. He subsequently said that he would probably sit as an "independent Conservative". He threatened to quit the Conservatives to join UKIP, which he did on 7 January 2007, along with Lord Willoughby de Broke.

Pearson criticised the Conservative Party's leadership for being "silly" and argued that they should try to get UKIP members back into the fold by adopting more eurosceptic policies themselves. He has tabled a number of unsuccessful bills in the House of Lords demanding Britain's withdrawal from the European Union. In November 2006, he tabled the European Union (Implications of Withdrawal) Bill, which called for an official cost benefit analysis of UK's EU membership. He joined UKIP on 7 January 2007, citing David Cameron's refusal to tell the British people about the disadvantages they suffer because of Britain's membership of the EU.

Leader of the UK Independence Party
In September 2009, Pearson announced his candidacy in the 2009 UKIP leadership election. He won the election and was announced the new leader of UKIP on 27 November 2009. He led the party through the 2010 general election, appearing on BBC News' Campaign Show with Jon Sopel on 19 April 2010. During the interview, to talk about the party's recently launched manifesto, he appeared to have limited knowledge of what was in the manifesto, saying that he was not prepared to discuss the "minutiae" of his party's policies. He added, "I haven't remembered it all in great detail. I didn't come on to talk about this sort of thing."

Pearson resigned his leadership in August 2010, saying he was "not much good at party politics" and that UKIP "deserved a better politician to lead it".

Expenses
Shortly after Pearson's election as UKIP leader in 2009, the Daily Telegraph reported that he had claimed more than £115,000 in Parliamentary expenses between 2001 and 2007, having designated his estate in Scotland as his main residence, although his £3.7m house in London was designated as his principal residence for tax purposes, and he was thus not liable for £275,000 in capital gains tax when he sold his London house in 2006.

In reply, Pearson argued that he spent "half the year" at his Scottish estate, stating that the sum covered several years in expenses and that working as a public servant had cost him "millions" as a result of having to give up salaried work.

Later career 
In October 2019, Pearson resigned from UKIP to sit as an independent.

He is also the co-founder of pro-free-trade think-tank, Global Britain, which publishes research on the BBC's EU coverage and on the cost of UK membership of the EU. He is active in the pro-hunting Countryside Alliance, serving as chairman of its deerstalking committee.

Islam 
In February 2009, Lord Pearson and cross-bencher Baroness Cox invited the Dutch Freedom Party leader, Geert Wilders, to show the anti-Islam film Fitna before the House of Lords. Jacqui Smith, then Home Secretary, subsequently excluded Wilders from entry to the UK. In response, Pearson and Cox accused the then Government of "appeasing" militant Islam. Wilders appealed successfully against his exclusion, and the film was eventually shown in the Lords in 2010.

In November 2013, Pearson warned that UK Muslim communities were home to "thousands of potential home-grown terrorists". He said Sharia law was "running de facto in our land" and that calls for violence were not simply coming from a "few extremists", stating: "These people hate us with frightening religious fervour and we are right to fear them." His comments were condemned by Sayeeda Warsi, the Minister of State for Faith and Communities, who responded by stating: "It points at best to an ignorance about Islam and at worst a deliberate attempt to perpetuate a distorted image of the faith."

In June 2014, during a debate on the Trojan Horse Affair – "What Faith in Our Schools?", hosted in Birmingham by the BBC, Lord Pearson asked: "Given all that is happening in Africa as well, why do the Government go on intoning that Islam is a religion of peace?"

In November 2014, Pearson suggested that the Quran had inspired the murder of Fusilier Lee Rigby, referring to "the violence in the Qur'an – and indeed in the life and the example of Muhammad". Member of Parliament Yasmin Qureshi called Pearson's words "lies" and "nonsensical rubbish", while another MP, Khalid Mahmood, called them Islamophobic and said: "Obviously he hasn't read the Qur'an. Islam is about submission to the Almighty. It is not about war against anybody else."

In March 2018, Pearson invited Tommy Robinson to Parliament. A UKIP spokesperson said that Pearson had invited journalists to report on a question he asked in the House of Lords about grooming gangs and that Robinson was one of 160 people contacted by Pearson.

Pearson has been described as part of the counter-jihad movement.

Personal life 
Pearson has been married three times:

 firstly to Francesca Frua de Angeli in 1965, with whom he had one daughter, Silvia Lady Le Marchant (b.1966) and whom he divorced in 1970; 
 secondly to the Hon. Mary Charteris (daughter of Martin Charteris, Baron Charteris of Amisfield) in 1977, with whom he had two daughters (Marina and Zara) and whom he divorced in 1996; 
 thirdly to Caroline St Vincent Rose in 1997.

References

External links
Lord Pearson on the UKIP website

1942 births
Living people
Counter-jihad activists
People educated at Eton College
Independent politicians in the United Kingdom
Conservative Party (UK) life peers
Leaders of the UK Independence Party
People from Devizes
Members of the Freedom Association
UK Independence Party life peers
British critics of Islam
Life peers created by Elizabeth II
British Eurosceptics